Václav Beneš Třebízský (27 February 1849 in Třebíz – 20 June 1884 in Mariánské Lázně) was a Czech novelist. He is the author of numerous historical novels and children's stories. His best novel is arguably In the Early Evening of the Five-Petaled Roses (1885).

Life
In 1875, Třebízský became a chaplain in Liteň. In 1876–1884, Třebízský was a chaplain in Klecany, where he wrote most of his major works.

Třebízský died in 1884 in Mariánské Lázně after contracting tuberculosis.

References

Czech male novelists
1849 births
1884 deaths
People from Kladno District
19th-century Czech Roman Catholic priests
19th-century Czech novelists
19th-century male writers
Burials at Vyšehrad Cemetery